In geology, a diastem (plural: diastems) is a short interruption in sedimentation with little or no erosion. They can also be described as very short unconformities (more precisely as very short paraconformities).In 1917 Joseph barrel of USA estimated the rate of deposition of succession  from the available  radiometric age. His accumulation showed that the strata accumulation was at the rate of thousands of years per foot rather than hundreds. He stated that diastems are universal  in sedimentary rocks and explain them as a product of fluctuation of base level.

Definition 
The International Commission on Stratigraphy defines a diastem as

"[a] short interruption in deposition with little or no erosion before resumption of sedimentation"

Duration 
Studies indicate that the age contained in diastems ranges from a few hundred to a few thousand years in shelf settings as well as throughout the Paleozoic.

References 
 

Stratigraphy
Unconformities